Acampe praemorsa is a species of monopodial orchid. It distributed in India, Sri Lanka, Thailand and Burma.

External links
 
 

praemorsa